Blessing of the Sea is a 2019 South Korean television series starring Lee So-yeon, Jae Hee, and Jo An. The series aired every Monday to Friday at 19:15 (KST) on MBC.

Synopsis
Shim Cheong-yi, a woman with an absolute vision that reads thousands of colors from all over the world, meets pianist Ma Poong-do who sees the world only in black and white. He shares love and life's beauty, and discovers the secret of her lost father.

Cast

Main
 Lee So-yeon as Shim Chung-yi
 Jae Hee as Ma Poong-do
 Jo An as Yeo Ji-na
 Kim Hyung-min as Baek Shi-joon

Supporting
Ahn Nae-sang as Shim Hak-kyu (Chung Yi's  feed father )
Geum Bo-ra as Bang Duk-hee (Chung Yi's feed mother)
Ha Eun-jin as Jo Hun-jung (Shi Joon's cousin / Chung Yi's friend)
Jun Ah-min as Lee Woo-yang (Hun Jung's husband)
Lee El-bin as Lee Tae-yang (Hun Jung & Woo Yang's son)
Oh Mi-yeon as Ma Young-in (Ma Poong-do's grandmother)
Im Ji-eun as Ma Jae-ran
Park Jung-hak as Seo Pil-doo
Lee Seul-ah (이슬아) as Oh Kwi Nyeo (Jae-ran's daughter)
Yoon Bok-in as Jung Moo-shim (Shi Joon's mother)
Kim Do-hye as Jung Yeol-mae (Moo Shim's adopted daughter)
Baek Bo-ram (백보람) as Go Yong-jung
Min Chan-ki (민찬기) as Ryan (Poong-do's manager)
Im Ho as Jo Ji-hwan (Shim Chung's biological father)

Ratings
In this table,  represent the lowest ratings and  represent the highest ratings.

References

External links
 

Korean-language television shows
MBC TV television dramas
Television series by MBC C&I
South Korean melodrama television series
2019 South Korean television series debuts
2019 South Korean television series endings